Withana Pathiranage Milan Sajith Jayathilaka (born 1 August 1981) is a Sri Lankan politician and Member of Parliament.

Jayathilaka was born on 1 August 1981. He was a member of Dompe Divisional Council.  He contested the 2020 parliamentary election as a Sri Lanka People's Freedom Alliance electoral alliance candidate in Gampaha District and was elected to the Parliament of Sri Lanka.

References

1981 births
Local authority councillors of Sri Lanka
Living people
Members of the 16th Parliament of Sri Lanka
Prisoners and detainees of Sri Lanka
Sinhalese politicians
Sri Lankan Buddhists
Sri Lankan prisoners and detainees
Sri Lanka People's Freedom Alliance politicians
Sri Lanka Podujana Peramuna politicians